The Silian Halt railway station was a small railway station at Silian, the first stop after the junction on the Aberayron branch of the Carmarthen to Aberystwyth Line in the Welsh county of Ceredigion. Opened by the Lampeter, Aberayron and New Quay Light Railway. The branch diverged from the through line at Lampeter.

History
The branch was incorporated into the Great Western Railway during the Grouping of 1923, passing on to the Western Region of British Railways on nationalisation in 1948. Passenger services were discontinued in 1951, general freight in 1963 and milk traffic in 1973. The single brick built platform still survives, unlike others that were built from wooden railway sleepers. The track was lifted in the summer of 1975.

References
Notes

Sources

Great Western Railway Journal Vol 2 No 16 (Autumn 1995)

Former Great Western Railway stations
Disused railway stations in Ceredigion
Railway stations in Great Britain opened in 1911
Railway stations in Great Britain closed in 1951
1911 establishments in Wales